"Rhythm of Love" is a song by German Eurodance group DJ Company, released in 1994. Vocals were provided by January Ordu and rappers Brian Thomas and Michael Fielder. The song appeared on the compilation Euro Dance Pool. In 1997, a new version of "Rhythm of Love" was created with more vocals and no rapping. It was released in the U.S. and reached No. 53 on the Billboard Hot 100 and No. 8 on the Dance Maxi Single Sales chart.

Charts

References

External links 
 http://www.releaselyrics.com/09a0/dj-company-rhythm-of-love/

1994 songs
1994 singles
DJ Company songs